First Baptist Church, previously known as Leaksville Baptist Church, is a historic Baptist church located at 538 Greenwood Street in Eden, Rockingham County, North Carolina.  It was built in 1886, and is a Gothic Revival style brick church. It has a hipped roof with intersecting gables and Stick Style decoration in the gable ends. It features lancet windows and a wooden Gothic belfry with pointed steeple centered on the roof. Two Colonial Revival style additions were made to the church in 1934 and 1937.

It was added to the National Register of Historic Places in 1989.

References

Baptist churches in North Carolina
Churches on the National Register of Historic Places in North Carolina
Gothic Revival church buildings in North Carolina
Colonial Revival architecture in North Carolina
Churches completed in 1886
19th-century Baptist churches in the United States
Churches in Rockingham County, North Carolina
National Register of Historic Places in Rockingham County, North Carolina